Kurakkanni is the north western area of Varkala Town in Varkala Municipality of Trivandrum district in the state of Kerala, India.

Varkala Helipad, Govt Guest House, Varkala Palace, Varkala Aquarium, Varkala Hatchery and the National Centre for Performing Arts are located in Kurakkanni.

References

Cities and towns in Thiruvananthapuram district